Sioux Falls Roller Dollz (SFRD) is a women's flat track roller derby league based in Sioux Falls, South Dakota. Founded in 2006, the league currently consists of two teams, and two mixed teams which compete against teams from other leagues. Sioux Falls is a member of the Women's Flat Track Derby Association (WFTDA).

History
The league was founded by Elizabeth "Queen Elizabitch" Nelson and Jayme "PainMaker" Nelson (no relation) in October 2006, after they watched Rollergirls on television and saw a live bout between the Mad Rollin' Dolls and the Minnesota RollerGirls. They were immediately able to recruit a group of around twenty skaters. They constituted the first league in South Dakota; when a second league, the Rushmore Rollerz, was set up, the Dollz acted as mentors to it.

The Roller Dollz joined the Women's Flat Track Derby Association in 2008, playing their first sanctioned bout against the North Star Rollergirls in January 2009.

By May 2011, the Dollz had raised an estimated $40,000 for local charities.  In late 2011, they toured to England, to play the London Rollergirls, Central City Rollergirls and Lincolnshire Bombers Roller Girls.

WFTDA rankings

References

Sports in Sioux Falls, South Dakota
Roller derby leagues established in 2006
Roller derby leagues in South Dakota
2006 establishments in South Dakota